The Falls Road Railroad  is a Class III short line railroad owned by Genesee Valley Transportation (GVT). The railroad operates in Niagara, Orleans, and Monroe counties in New York.

Operations
A yard and engine house are maintained in Lockport, NY, where the railroad interchanges with CSX. The railroad is known for its use of Alco locomotives.

Falls Road Branch
The name Falls Road originates from the Lockport and Niagara Falls Railroad, and was adopted by New York Central—and later Conrail—to refer to the section of railroad track between Lockport and Rochester, New York.  In 1994, Conrail abandoned twelve miles (19 km) of track between Rochester and Brockport, New York; the Falls Road Branch now terminates in Brockport, east of Owens Road at Mile Post 16.60.  The Falls Road provides rail service to the Western New York Energy, LLC ethanol plant near Medina, New York.

Locomotive history
In 2000, Falls Road Railroad was operating locomotives #1802 (RS-11) and #1804 (RS-11).  By 2006 #1802 still remained, but #1804 was long gone and on another Genesee Valley Transportation (GVT) shortline.  #334 (C420) took #1804's spot.  As of the year 2008, #1802 continued to serve the FRR; however, #334 was shipped out and sold to another company who repainted her on another shortline that is not GVT owned.  #2035 (RS-32) came to take #334's place.  Ever since #334 was replaced by #2035, the power has remained the same.  #1802 is still on the FRR, and since the words Falls Road Railroad are painted on her side, there is no sign of her leaving anytime soon.  #2035 is also still on the FRR as of 2019, and painted in the Genesee Valley livery.

Engine roster
The Falls Road Railroad, like all other GVT properties, is Alco-powered.  The railroad uses one New York Central vintage RS32 (2035) as well as one Nickel Plate vintage RS-11 (1802).  The 2035 is the primary engine; however, 1802 will be used on days when an extra train, such as a passenger excursion or snowplow, is needed.

Excursions and extra trains
The current two locomotives, RS-32 #2035 and RS-11 #1802, are the only two locomotives currently operating on the Falls Road Railroad. #2035 is the primary locomotive, because it is a Low Hood. It has more visibility. #1802 is used on extra trains when 2035 is busy. This can include an excursion, corn train, ethanol train, or snow plow. 1802 is a High Hood, so the visibility is a bit less than 2035. The FRR regularly runs excursions for the Medina Railroad Museum, and if the freight local is busy being worked by 2035, 1802 is put in for the excursion. Also, sometimes corn trains are needed to go to Medina for the ethanol plant, or an ethanol train needs to go from Medina to Lockport for CSX to pick up. If the train is long enough, 1802 will help 2035 running double teamed. If 2035 is on the local, 1802 will step in to take the corn or ethanol train where it needs to go. Even though snowfall heavy enough to make the FRR break out their big plow is rare, sometimes it has to be done. In that case, if 2035 is going to be busy, 1802 will do the plowing.  If the snow happens to be too dense, 1802 will team with 2035 to do the plowing together.

NIAX

The Niagara & Western New York Railroad  was a short-lived company that operated a heritage railroad and excursion train service for the Falls Road Railroad.  The trains ran between Lockport and Medina, New York for the single, 2002 season.  Three locomotives were leased from Guilford Rail System: two GE U18Bs and one EMD GP7, all of Maine Central Railroad heritage.  The railroad operated three passenger cars.  Today, occasional excursions are operated between Lockport and Medina by the Medina Railroad Museum and Genesee Valley Transportation.  Lockport boarding has been moved to GVT's Michigan Street Yard.

References

New York (state) railroads
Spin-offs of Conrail